The 2013 National Pro Fastpitch season was the 10th season of professional softball under the name National Pro Fastpitch (NPF) for  the only professional women's softball league in the United States.  From 1997 to 2002, NPF operated under the names Women's Pro Fastpitch (WPF) and Women's Pro Softball League (WPSL).  Each year, the playoff teams battle for the Cowles Cup.

Milestones and events
The Carolina Diamonds ceased operations after the 2012 season.  NPF announced that an expansion team named the NY/NJ Comets would begin play in the 2013 season, with the Comets awarded the contracts of the Diamonds' players.

NPF reached a deal with ESPN to broadcast 16 games during the 2013 season.

Rule changes
After the 2012 NPF season ended without a champion, NPF instituted new procedures to name a champion if the Championship Series is not finished:
The creation of a policy and criteria, to award the Cowles Cup, in the event of inclement weather. That policy states a reserve day to play the Championships and also a tiered process for naming a champion if the Series cannot be finished. That policy is as follows:
   If no games have been played in the Final Series best of three - Championship is awarded to the highest seed
   If one game has been played in the Final Series best of three - Championship is awarded to the winner of game 1
   If two games have been played in the Final Series and each team has a loss - Championship is awarded to the team with the best win/loss head to head between the two competing teams during regular season league play. If that record is even, the Championship is awarded to the highest seed.

Other rule changes:
 Voted in favor of eliminating the international tie breaker in regular season play. (The tie breaker does not currently exist for Championship play either, so this move will essentially remove the tie breaker usage from NPF competition completely.)
More clearly defined the Franchise Player Tag, making it permanent for the year it is designated. Once FPT is assigned to a player, it is exhausted for that particular year and cannot be changed or transferred. In the case of a trade, the FPT remains exhausted and cannot be reassigned to any other player(s). 
 Voted in favor of changing the Draft order beginning in the 2014 Draft: Draft order will remain based on regular season finish of the previous year, but will alternate every other round from last place to first place in the opening round to first place to last place in the second round, and so on. 
 Voted in favor of defining the penalty for passing a draft pick. The penalty for "passing" beginning in the 2013 Draft, will be loss of the offending team's first draft selection in the subsequent year. 
 Voted to increase Team rights to drafted players. Rights to players will extend from the current policy to an additional year. Formerly, a Team held the rights to a drafted player until September 1 following the Draft. The new policy gives the team the right to a drafted player until a year from September 1 following the draft in which the player was chosen. Additionally, following that period, any team that picks up the drafted player, must compensate the drafting team an amount of $3,000.

Teams, cities and stadiums

Player acquisition

College draft

The 2013 NPF College Draft was held in Nashville, Tennessee on April 1 at 8:00 pm EST in Ford Theatre located in the Country Music Hall of Fame and Museum. Akron Racers selected pitcher Rachele Fico of LSU as the first overall pick.

Notable transactions
Ayumi Karino became the first Japanese player in NPF history when she signed a contract with Akron Racers.

League standings 
Source:

NPF Championship

Teams are seeded by the final standings.  The third- and fourth-seeded teams play each other, with the winner advancing.  The second seeded team plays the winner of game one.  The top seed plays a best-of-three series against the winner of game two.

Championship Game

Annual awards
Source

Award notes

See also

 List of professional sports leagues
 List of professional sports teams in the United States and Canada

References

External links 
 

Softball teams
2013 in women's softball
2013 in American women's sports
Softball in the United States